Descent Pass is a pass leading from Blue Glacier to Ferrar Glacier, in Victoria Land, Antarctica. It was so named by the party led by Albert Armitage of the British National Antarctic Expedition, 1901–04, because of the adventurous descent to Ferrar Glacier made here via Descent Glacier in 1902.

References

Mountain passes of Victoria Land
Scott Coast